A comb over or combover is a hairstyle commonly worn by  balding men in which the hair is grown long and combed over the bald area to minimize the appearance of baldness. Sometimes the parting is lowered so that more hair can be used to cover the balding area.

Examples 

 Iñaki Anasagasti – Basque nationalist
 Zero Mostel – actor, left-to-right and back-to-front
 Doug Anthony – former Deputy Prime Minister of Australia
 Rainer Barzel – former Christian Democratic Union of Germany chairman
 Joe Biden – 46th President of the United States – sported a comb-over during the late 1980s and early 1990s, when he was a senator.
 Robert Bork – American judge whose controversial nomination to the US Supreme Court was rejected
 Abdelaziz Bouteflika – President of Algeria
 Julius Caesar – combed his hair on the side
 Bobby Charlton – English World Cup winner
 Constantine I – combed his hair forward
 Charles W. Fairbanks – 26th vice president of the United States
 Jaime Guzmán Errázuriz – Chilean Senator
 Valéry Giscard d'Estaing – President of France
 Rudy Giuliani – former Mayor of New York City
 Gene Keady – Purdue University basketball coach
 Tan Soo Khoon – former Speaker of the Parliament of Singapore – had a combover in the 1980s
 Neil Kinnock – former leader of The Labour Party
 René Lévesque – former Premier of Quebec
 Carl Levin – American attorney
 Alexander Lukashenko – President of Belarus
 Douglas MacArthur – American general
 John McCain – former U.S. Senator of Arizona and 2008 U.S. presidential nominee
 Vladimir Putin – current President of Russia
 Wang Qishan – former Secretary of the Central Commission for Discipline Inspection of the Chinese Communist Party
 Heng Samrin – President of the National Assembly of Cambodia
 Robert Robinson – former game show host
 Gene Siskel – American film critic
 Donald Trump – 45th President of the United States

Patent 

On 10 May 1977, Donald J. Smith and his father, Frank J. Smith, of Orlando, Florida, were awarded a patent for their variation of the comb over that conceals baldness by combing long hair in three separate directions.

See also 
 List of hairstyles

References

Further reading

External links 
 
 

Hairstyles
Human appearance